This is a timeline of Solar System exploration ordering events in the exploration of the Solar System by date of spacecraft launch.
It includes:

All spacecraft that have left Earth orbit for the purposes of Solar System exploration (or were launched with that intention but failed), including lunar probes.
A small number of pioneering or notable Earth-orbiting craft.

It does not include:

Centuries of terrestrial telescopic observation. 
The great majority of Earth-orbiting satellites.
Space probes leaving Earth orbit that are not concerned with Solar System exploration (such as space telescopes targeted at distant galaxies, cosmic background radiation observatories, and so on).
Probes that failed at launch.

The dates listed are launch dates, but the achievements noted may have occurred some time laterin some cases, a considerable time later (for example, Voyager 2, launched 20 August 1977, did not reach Neptune until 1989).

1950s

1960s

1970s

1980s

1990s

2000s

2010s

2020s

Planned or scheduled

See also 

Discovery and exploration of the Solar System
List of missions to the Moon
List of missions to Mars
List of Solar System probes
List of space telescopes
New Frontiers program
Out of the Cradle – 1984 book about scientific speculation on future missions.
Space Race
Timeline of artificial satellites and space probes
Timeline of discovery of Solar System planets and their moons
Timeline of first orbital launches by country
Timeline of space exploration
Timeline of space travel by nationality
Timeline of spaceflight

References

External links
 NASA Lunar and Planetary Science
 NASA Solar System Strategic Exploration Plans
 Soviet Lunar, Martian, Venusian and Terrestrial Space Image Catalog

Solar System Exploration
Discovery and exploration of the Solar System